The 24th Cavalry Division was a cavalry division of the United States Army, mostly drawn from the National Guards of the Midwest states. It was created after World War I from the perceived need for additional cavalry units. It numbered in succession of the Regular Army divisions, which were not all active at its creation. Going into World War II, the US Army Cavalry Branch contained three Regular Army, four National Guard, and six Organized Reserve cavalry divisions, as well as one independent cavalry brigade.

Like the other National Guard cavalry divisions, the 24th Cavalry Division was geographically dispersed across the United States. At various points during its existence, the division was composed of, or intended to have been composed of, personnel from the Idaho, Iowa, Kansas, Minnesota, North Dakota, South Dakota, Utah, Washington, and Wyoming National Guards.

History

The 24th Cavalry Division was constituted in the National Guard in 1921 and assigned to the Third Army. It was reassigned to the Fourth Army in 1932. The division was not as affected by reorganizations as the other three National Guard cavalry divisions, and was able to organize its headquarters by 1936, three years before the other divisions. Like all National Guard cavalry divisions, a significant impediment to training was the geographical dispersion of the division's units, which made the assembly of units larger than a regiment difficult.

Organization (1940)

The headquarters location of the unit is shown where organized. Two asterisks indicated the unit was allotted, but unorganized or inactive, with the state of headquarters allocation shown.

 Headquarters (Topeka, Kansas)
 Headquarters, Special Troops (Iowa National Guard) **
 Headquarters Troop (Tacoma, Washington)
 24th Signal Troop (Sioux City, Iowa)
 128th Ordnance Company (Medium) (Iowa National Guard) **
 24th Tank Company (Light) (Not allotted)

 57th Cavalry Brigade (Des Moines, Iowa)
 Headquarters Troop (Des Moines, Iowa)
 113th Cavalry Regiment (Des Moines, Iowa)
 114th Cavalry Regiment (Topeka, Kansas)
 58th Cavalry Brigade (Boise, Idaho)
 Headquarters Troop (Nampa, Idaho)
 115th Cavalry Regiment (Cheyenne, Wyoming)
 116th Cavalry Regiment (Boise, Idaho)
 24th Reconnaissance Squadron (Torrington, Wyoming)
 168th Field Artillery Regiment (Denver, Colorado)
 128th Engineer Squadron (Colorado National Guard) **
 124th Medical Squadron (Colorado National Guard) **
 124th Quartermaster Squadron (Iowa National Guard) **
 120th Observation Squadron (Denver, Colorado)

Disbandment

Pre-war United States Army planning did not contemplate the use of National Guard or Organized Reserve cavalry divisions in wartime. After the disbandment of the National Guard cavalry divisions, former division units either remained intact and separate, were absorbed by other units, were converted to units of other arms, or were disbanded. The 24th Cavalry Division was inactivated on 6 October 1940, and was disbanded on 1 November 1940.

References
Colorado. National Guard of the State of Colorado: Pictorial 1939 Review. Atlanta: Army-Navy Publishers, 1939.  Provided a detachment to the 24th Cavalry Division.
 U.S. Army Order of Battle 1919–1941, Volume 2. The Arms: Cavalry, Field Artillery, and Coast Artillery, 1919–41 by Lieutenant Colonel (Retired) Steven E. Clay, Combat Studies Institute Press, Fort Leavenworth, KS, 2011
 Maneuver and Firepower, The Evolution of Divisions and Separate Brigades, by John B. Wilson, Center of Military History, Washington D.C., 1998
 Cavalry Regiments of the U S Army by James A. Sawicki Wyvern Pubns; June 1985

External links
Formations of the United States Army

24